Akok is a small town in northern Gabon on the border with Cameroon.

External links
Satellite map

Populated places in Woleu-Ntem Province
Cameroon–Gabon border crossings